The Abu Bakr Mosque is one of the oldest mosques in Medina, Saudi Arabia. It is located towards the south-west side of Al-Masjid an-Nabawi.

It is being said that it was a site where Muhammad used to offer Eid prayers and the same tradition was continued by Abu Bakr after Muhammad's death.

See also
 List of mosques in Saudi Arabia

References

Mosques in Medina